The Tierra Blanca Joven eruption of Lake Ilopango was the largest volcanic eruption in El Salvador during historic times with a Volcanic explosivity index of 6, dating back in the mid 5th century A.D. The eruption ejected about  of dense rock equivalent. The eruption was one of the largest volcanic events on Earth in recorded history, i.e. within the last 7,000 years. The date of the eruption is constrained to be within 429–433 CE by identifying volcanic ash in precisely dated Greenland ice core thus eliminating it as the cause of extreme weather events of 535–536.

Volcanic eruption
The Tierra Blanca Joven eruption is El Salvador's largest volcanic eruption in the last 10,000 years. This VEI-6 Plinian eruption occurred during the 5th century and was larger than the 1883 eruption of Krakatoa or the 1991 eruption of Mount Pinatubo, having probably been more comparable to the 1815 eruption of Mount Tambora. The eruption devastated an area of up to  radius around the volcano.

See also
 1257 Samalas eruption
 1815 eruption of Mount Tambora
 List of large Holocene volcanic eruptions
 Volcanic winter
 Year Without a Summer

References

External links
 Global Volcanism Program: Ilopango
 Lake Ilopango at NASA Earth Observatory website
 Volcano Discovery: Ilopango

5th-century natural disasters
Natural disasters in El Salvador
Events that forced the climate
VEI-6 eruptions
Plinian eruptions
Ancient volcanic events